is a redevelopment district located on the site of the former Takamatsu Freight Depot in Hamanochō, Takamatsu, Kagawa Prefecture, Japan. The development includes a shopping mall, hotel, apartments, convenience stores and several restaurants. Sunport also acts as the passenger terminal for JR Shikoku's Takamatsu Station, the ferries at Port of Takamatsu, a wide range of taxi and bus companies, and offers bicycle and car rentals. The headquarters of JR Shikoku is located here as well.

Nearby attractions
Ritsurin Garden
Takamatsu Castle (Sanuki)

Access
Takamatsu Station
Takamatsu Chikkō Station (Kotohira Line)

See also
 Port of Takamatsu

External links
 Live webcam overseeing parts of the Port of Takamatsu

Buildings and structures in Kagawa Prefecture
Takamatsu, Kagawa
Redeveloped ports and waterfronts in Japan